Karatz is a surname. Notable people with the surname include:

 Bruce Karatz (born 1945), American businessman
 Matthew Karatz (born 1972), American politician